Pusa is a genus of the earless seals, within the family Phocidae. The three species of this genus were split from the genus Phoca, and some sources still give Phoca as an acceptable synonym for Pusa.

The three species in this genus are found in Arctic and subarctic regions, as well as around the Caspian Sea. This includes these countries and regions: Russia, Finland, Scandinavia, Britain, Greenland, Canada, the United States, Iran, Azerbaijan, Kazakhstan, and Japan. Due to changing local environmental conditions, the ringed seals found in the Canadian region has varied patterns of growth. The northern Canadian ringed seals grow slowly to a larger size, while the southern seals grow quickly to a smaller size.

Only the Caspian seal species of Pusa is endangered, while two subspecies of the ringed seal are vulnerable and endangered, Ladoga seal and Saimaa ringed seal respectively.

Taxonomy

Species

References

 

Phocins
Mammal genera
Taxa named by Giovanni Antonio Scopoli